John Alexander Wilkinson (September 14, 1789 – September 17, 1862) was a judge and political figure in Upper Canada.

He was born in Dublin, Ireland in 1789. He came to Canada as a member of the British Army in 1814 and later settled at Sandwich (Windsor). He was named judge in the Surrogate Court for the Western District in 1836. He represented Essex in the 9th, 10th and 12th parliaments.

References 
Becoming Prominent: Leadership in Upper Canada, 1791-1841, J.K. Johnson (1989)

1789 births
1862 deaths
Immigrants to Upper Canada
Irish emigrants to pre-Confederation Ontario
Members of the Legislative Assembly of Upper Canada
Politicians from Dublin (city)
Upper Canada judges